Milan Radulović (born 18 August 1981 in Titograd) is a Montenegrin retired footballer.

Club career
Radulović played for GKS Bełchatów. He left Mladost Podgorica for Swedish side Nordvärmlands FF in February 2013.

References

External links

 FK Buducnost Podgorica Official website
 Early career at Dekisa.Tripod.

1981 births
Living people
Footballers from Podgorica
Association football defenders
Serbia and Montenegro footballers
Serbia and Montenegro under-21 international footballers
Montenegrin footballers
FK Zeta players
GKS Bełchatów players
Hapoel Ironi Kiryat Shmona F.C. players
FK Mogren players
FK Dečić players
FK Budućnost Podgorica players
OFK Titograd players
First League of Serbia and Montenegro players
Ekstraklasa players
Montenegrin First League players
Serbia and Montenegro expatriate footballers
Expatriate footballers in Poland
Serbia and Montenegro expatriate sportspeople in Poland
Montenegrin expatriate footballers
Expatriate footballers in Sweden
Montenegrin expatriate sportspeople in Sweden